State Route 32 (abbreviated SR 32) is part of Maine's system of numbered state highways, located in the southern coastal part of the state.  It runs  from an intersection with SR 130 in Bristol north to Windsor where it ends at U.S. Route 202 (US 202), SR 100, and SR 137 Business.

Route description 
The route meanders north for almost , through the eastern side of town, along Muscongus Bay, and through the small town of Bremen without any major intersections. SR 32 enters the town of Waldoboro where it crosses US 1 before heading northwest to Jefferson. In the town center SR 32 intersects and briefly overlaps with SR 126. SR 32 also overlaps with SR 17 and both routes cross into Windsor, immediately intersecting with SR 218. SR 32 and SR 17 continue west for just over three miles before SR 32 splits off to the north and meets SR 105 in the town center. SR 32 continues due north for another six miles into the southwestern corner of China, where it intersects with the Augusta-Belfast Road (US 202 / SR 3 / SR 9). SR 32 joins the multiplexed routes for 1.3 miles before again turning north. The highway continues for another ten miles into Winslow, crossing over SR 137 and briefly joining SR 137 Business before terminating at US 201 / SR 100 at the confluence of the Sebasticook and Kennebec Rivers at Winslow.

History 
SR 32 has maintained its current alignment from Bristol to Winslow since it was designated in the late 1930s.  Its route from Bristol to Waldoboro was entirely new, while the rest of the route replaced older designations.

SR 32 originally continued north along the Sebasticook River to Benton, ending at SR 11/SR 139, but was truncated to its current northern terminus in 1954.  The orphaned northern alignment was considered to be an alternate to SR 100 (which predated US 202) and was designated SR 100A.

Major intersections

References

External links

032
Transportation in Lincoln County, Maine
Transportation in Kennebec County, Maine